This is a list of teachers of Nyaya (including Navya-Nyāya), one of the six astika  Hindu philosophical systems.

 Akṣapāda Gautama
 Vātsyāyana
 Udyotakara
 Jayanta Bhatta
 Vācaspati Miśra
 Bhāsavarajña
 Udayana
 Gangeśa Upādhyāya
 Vardhamāna Upādhyāya
 Pakṣadhara Miśra
 Vāsudeva Sārvabhauma
 Padmanābha Miśra
 Raghunātha Śiromaṇi
 Janakinath Bhattacharya
 Kanad Tarkavagish
 Rambhadra Sārvabhauma
 Haridas Bhattacharya
 Mathuranath Tarkavagish
 Jagadish Tarkalankar
Jaygopal Tarkalankar
 Gadadhar Bhattacharya 
 Annaṁbhaṭṭa
 Viśvanātha
 Radhamohan Vidyavachaspati Goswami 
 Kalishankar Siddhantavagish (1781-1830)
 Golaknath Nyayaratna (1807-1855)

References
 Vidyabhusana, Satis Chandra (1920, reprint 2006). A History of Indian Logic: Ancient, Mediaeval, and Modern Schools, Delhi:Motilal Banarsidass, . 

!
Nyaya